Alfonso Visconti (1552–1608) was an Italian Roman Catholic cardinal and diplomat.

Life
Alfonso Visconti was born in Milan in 1552. He was the son of the Count Annibale, member of the Saliceto branch of the noble family of Visconti, and of Lucia Sauli of Genoa.

He graduated in utroque iure in the University of Pavia and he moved to Rome. He was ordained a priest in 1575, and two years later he entered in the Oratory of Saint Philip Neri. His first important step in the ecclesiastical career was the appointment as referendary of the Tribunals of the Apostolic Signature of Justice and of Grace.

Pope Gregory XIII appointed him on 14 May 1584 Apostolic Nuncio to Portugal (with the title of Collector), an office he kept until 22 February 1586 when the Pope sent him vice-legate before Archduke Albert of Austria, ruler of the Habsburg Netherlands. Returned to Rome, he was appointed Auditor of the Apostolic Camera by Pope Sixtus V.

The new Pope Gregory XIV, a far relative, on 15 April 1489 appointed Alfonso as Apostolic Nuncio to the Emperor, and already on 4 July of that year he arrived in Prague where Emperor Rudolf II kept his court. As Nuncio, Alfonso tried without success to persuade the Emperor to appoint the Archduke Ernest of Austria as successor, and in 1590 he tried to quickly find a successor to the Archbishop of Prague, while this diocese, important for the fight against the Protestants, remained vacant for three years. He remained Nuncio to the Emperor up to 22 April 1591.

Pope Gregory XIV made him Bishop of Cervia on 8 February 1591 with the idea of sending him as Nuncio in Spain. He left Prague on 1 July 1591 and on the way back to Italy he was consecrated Bishop in Salzburg on 14 July by Wolf Dietrich von Raitenau. The sudden death of Pope Gregory XIV did not allow him to go to Spain, but he obtained some offices in the administration of the Papal States, being appointed Governor of the conclaves of 1591 and 1592 (and in the meantime also Guvernor of Borgo in Rome), and Guvernor of Ascoli Piceno, Norcia and of Montalto on 5 February 1592.

In 1595 the Pope entrusted him of the important diplomatic mission before the Prince of Transylvania Sigismund Báthory, in order to strengthen the Holy League organized bu the Pope against the Ottoman Empire. Following the instructions of the Pope, Alfonso urged Sigismund Báthory to reconciliate himself with the Emperor Rudof II, and supported his cavalry with huge amounts of money. Before returning in Italy, Alfonso visited the King of Poland Sigismund III Vasa.

Pope Clement VIII elevated him to the dignity of cardinal in the consistory of 3 March 1599. Initially appointed as cardinal priest the Titular church of San Giovanni a Porta Latina, on 24 January 1600 until he was appointed cardinal priest of San Sisto Vecchio.

From 10 September 1601 until his death, Alfonso Visconti served as Bishop of Spoleto and from 1604 to 1607 as Cardinal Protector for the Austrian hereditary lands. Cardinal Visconti participanted in the two conclaves of March 1605 and May 1605.

On 23 October 1606 he was made Legate (i.e. Governor) of the Marche region, based in the town of Macerata, where he fought the bandits present in the Apennine Mountains. He died in Macerata on 19 September 1608 and he was buried in the Basilica of Loreto.

References

1552 births
1608 deaths
17th-century Italian cardinals
Apostolic Nuncios to the Holy Roman Empire
Apostolic Nuncios to Portugal
Alfonso Visconti
17th-century Italian Roman Catholic bishops
16th-century Italian cardinals